The Sentro Rizal is a Philippine government-sponsored organization whose main objective is the global promotion of Filipino art, culture, and language. Established by virtue of the National Cultural Heritage Act of 2009, its headquarters is located at the National Commission for Culture and the Arts (NCCA) office in Intramuros, Manila. Sentro Rizal aims to promote Philippine arts, culture, and language throughout the world through the establishment of Philippine centers in various countries which initiate and organize cultural training programs and activities for overseas Filipinos.

Sentro Rizal is named after José Rizal, the Philippines' acclaimed national hero, writer, and polymath. His works Noli Me Tángere and El Filibusterismo are acknowledged to have sparked the country's quest for independence in 1898. He championed love of family and country, peace, freedom, human dignity, knowledge, use of local language, bravery, women's role in nation building, unity, compassion, productive involvement of the youth, among others.

Logo
The official logo of the Sentro Rizal is composed of two elements, the balangay and baybayin which are both significant to Filipino heritage. The letters "S" and "R" are rendered in the ancient Filipino syllabic script known as baybayin and are stylized to form a balangay, an ancient Philippine edged-pegged plank boat, reflecting the maritime heritage of the Philippines and depicting the character of Filipino migrants. The balangay also represents the quest of individuals in exploring the real essence of Filipino identity through culture and arts.

The Sentro Rizal acts as the balangay which provides overseas Filipinos and their children the means to connect to their roots – instilling a strong sense of nationhood and pride among them in being Filipinos.

The color of the Sentro Rizal logo was patterned from NCCA's logo – blue and gold.

Cultural centers
As of September 2020, there are 35 Sentros Rizal in the following locations:

Activities and programs
In 2015, the first Filipino language pilot class was conducted in Phnom Penh, Cambodia. Twenty-four students completed the first beginner's level language class, dubbed "Masayang Matuto ng Filipino".

The Commission on Filipinos Overseas has made use of digital media in disseminating Filipiniana for overseas Filipinos, called the "Virtual Sentro Rizal". This Filipiniana collection consists of 250 gigabytes of data including 72 hours of video of Filipino cultural materials covering different genres across regions.

See also
Alliance française
Asian Cultural Council
British Council
Confucius Institute
Dante Alighieri Society
Goethe-Institut
Instituto Camões
Instituto Cervantes
Japan Foundation
Korean Cultural Center
King Sejong Institute
Taiwan Academy

References

External links
 Official website of the Sentro Rizal
 Sentro Rizal introductory video

Cultural promotion organizations
Memorials to José Rizal
Government agencies under the Office of the President of the Philippines
Education in Intramuros
Organizations established in 2009
2009 establishments in the Philippines